SJV may refer to:

 San Javier Airport (Bolivia), IATA airport code
 Stern Joint Venture, L.P., founded by James D. Stern
 Shree Jain Vidyalaya, Kolkata, India, a secondary school
 Saint John Vianney College Seminary, Minneapolis-Saint-Paul, Minnesota, USA, a component of the Seminaries of Saint Paul
 St. Jean Vianney School, Baton Rouge, Louisiana, USA
 St. John Vianney Cure of Ars Church (Bronx), New York City, New York State, USA
 Socialist Youth League of Germany (SJV)

See also